The College of Medicine Building (Malay: Bangunan Maktab Perubatan; Chinese: 医药学院大厦) is a historic building in Singapore, located within the grounds of the Singapore General Hospital at Outram Park, within the Bukit Merah Planning Area near Singapore's central business district. Its name comes from its former function as the location for the King Edward VII College of Medicine, the first school of medicine in British Malaya (Present day: Malaysia and Singapore).

References

National Heritage Board (2002), Singapore's 100 Historic Places, Archipelago Press, 
Norman Edwards, Peter Keys (1996), Singapore - A Guide to Buildings, Streets, Places, Times Books International, 
Edwin Lee (1990), Historic Buildings of Singapore, Preservation of Monuments Board, 
Teo ES. "The history of the College of Medicine and Tan Teck Guan Buildings". Annals of the Academy of Medicine of Singapore. 2005 Jul;34(6):61C-71C.

External links
KE VII College of Medicine: Snapshots through the years

Landmarks in Singapore
National monuments of Singapore
School buildings completed in 1926
Bukit Merah
Buildings and structures in Central Region, Singapore
1926 establishments in British Malaya
20th-century architecture in Singapore